The men's 5000 metre relay in short track speed skating at the 1992 Winter Olympics took place on 18 and 22 February at La halle de glace Olympique.

Results

Heats
The round one heats were held on 18 February. The top two teams and two fastest third place teams advanced to the semifinals.

Heat 1

Heat 2

Heat 3

Semifinals
The semifinals were held on 22 February. The top two teams in each semifinal qualified for the A final, while the third and fourth place teams advanced to the B Final.

Semifinal 1

Semifinal 2

Finals
The four qualifying teams competed in Final A, while four others raced in Final B.

Final A

Final B

References

Men's short track speed skating at the 1992 Winter Olympics